Nahta Cone is a cinder cone in northern British Columbia, Canada, located  southwest of Tatogga,  north of Wetalth Ridge and south of Telegraph Creek. It lies in the southwestern corner of Mount Edziza Provincial Park.

History
Nahta Cone was named on January 2, 1980 by the Geological Survey of Canada after the last seven survivors of the Wetalth people, a group outcast or exiled from the Tahltans in time past. Nahta is a Tahltan word meaning seven.

Geology
Nahta Cone is one of the youngest volcanic features in the Spectrum Range which in turn form part of the Mount Edziza-Spectrum Range volcanic complex and the Northern Cordilleran Volcanic Province. It formed in the Holocene period.

See also
 List of volcanoes in Canada
 List of Northern Cordilleran volcanoes
 Volcanism of Canada
 Volcanism of Western Canada

References

External links
 Nahta Cone in the Canadian Mountain Encyclopedia

Cinder cones of British Columbia
Mount Edziza volcanic complex
Holocene volcanoes
Monogenetic volcanoes
Extinct volcanoes
One-thousanders of British Columbia